The 	City of Hammond Classic was an annual golf tournament for professional women golfers on the Futures Tour, the LPGA Tour's developmental tour. The event was played each year between 2003 and 2010 in the Hammond, Indiana area.

The presenting sponsor was Horseshoe Casino, a casino located in Hammond.

The tournament was a 54-hole event, as are most Futures Tour tournaments, and included pre-tournament pro-am opportunities, in which local amateur golfers can play with the professional golfers from the Tour as a benefit for local charities. The last benefiting charity from the City of Hammond Classic was the Lake Area United Way.

Tournament names through the years: 
2003–2004: The New Innsbrook Country Club Futures Golf Classic presented by Horseshoe Casino
2005: Northwest Indiana Futures Golf Classic
2006: Horseshoe Casino Futures Golf Classic
2007: United States Steel Golf Classic
2008–2009: Horseshoe Casino Classic at Lost Marsh Golf Course
2010: City of Hammond Classic presented by Horseshoe Casino Hammond

Winners

* Championship won in sudden-death playoff.

Tournament records

External links
Futures Tour official website
Lost Marsh Golf Course official website
Innsbrook Country Club official website

Former Symetra Tour events
Golf in Indiana